Avenida Cidade de Lisboa is an avenue west of the center of Praia, Santiago island, Cape Verde. It runs along the neighbourhoods of Várzea, Achadinha and Chã de Areia. It is one of the major arterial roads of the city.  The street is named for Praia's town twinning with the city of Lisbon, Portugal. It runs south to north, west of the Plateau (city centre). The annual carnival parade takes place on Avenida Cidade de Lisboa.
 
Notable buildings along the street:
Palácio do Governo
Estádio da Várzea
National Auditorium
National Library of Cape Verde
Sucupira Market

References

Várzea, Praia
Streets in Praia